Hasilden is a surname. Notable people with the surname include:

 Thomas Hasilden (disambiguation), multiple people
 Richard Hasilden (died 1405), English politician

See also
 Haselden